Parliamentary elections were held in Turkmenistan on 12 December 1999. All 50 seats were won by the Democratic Party of Turkmenistan, which remained the sole legal party.

Campaign
In contrast to the 1994 election where all the seats were won uncontested, 104 candidates — all from the Democratic Party of Turkmenistan, the only legal party in the state — fought for 50 seats.

Conduct
The Organization for Security and Co-operation in Europe declined to send observers in light of the brazen totalitarian regime in place.

Voting took place between 08:00 and 18:00. Voter turnout was on a par with other elections.

Results

Aftermath
The inaugural session was held on 7 January December. Niyazov returned as the Prime Minister, as did Muradov as the Chairman. Shortly, the Assembly would declare Saparmurat Niyazov as the President for Life.

References

Turkmenistan
Elections in Turkmenistan
Parliamentary
One-party elections
Election and referendum articles with incomplete results